The Turkic languages are a group of languages spoken across Eastern Europe, the Middle East, Central Asia and Siberia. 
Turkic languages are spoken as native languages by some 200 million people.

Turkic languages by subfamily
The number of speakers derived from statistics or estimates (2022) and were rounded:

Turkic languages by the number of speakers

The Turkic languages are a language family of at least 35  documented languages, spoken by the Turkic peoples. The number of speakers derived from statistics or estimates (2019) and were rounded:

Endangered Turkic languages 

An endangered language, or moribund language, is a language that is at risk of falling out of use as its speakers die out or shift to speaking another language. Language loss occurs when the language has no more native speakers and becomes a "dead language".

25 endangered Turkic languages exist in World. The number of speakers derived from statistics or estimates (2019) and were rounded:

Extinct Turkic languages

Famous Turkic Dialects

Hypothetical ancestors
Hypothetical relation to other language families and their proto-languages

Proto-Human (?) 
Several unknown language families and links (?) 
Borean/Boreal (?) 
Nostratic (?) 
Eurasiatic (?) 
Uralo-Siberian - Altaic
Altaic (?)
Pre-Proto-Turkic (?)

Ancestral

Proto-Turkic

Common Turkic (Shaz Turkic / Z Turkic)

Siberian Turkic

South Siberian
Altai Turkic
Northern Altai
Tuba
Kumandy/Qumanda
Turachak
Solton
Starobardinian
Chalkan (Kuu/Qu, Lebedin)
Chulym Turkic
Chulym
Lower Chulym (Küerik) (now believed extinct)
Middle Chulym
Upper Chulym
Sayan Turkic (dialect continuum)
Tofa
Tuha
Tsengel Tuvan
Tuvan
Western/Khemchik River (It is influenced by Altai)
Central (the geographical centrality of this dialect meant it was similar to the language spoken by most Tuvans, whether or not exactly the same). Forms the basis of the standard and literary language and includes:
Ovyur 
Bii-Khem
Northeastern/Todzhi (it is spoken near the upper course of the Bii-Khem River by the Tozhu Tuvans. The speakers of this dialect utilize nasalization. It contains a large vocabulary related to hunting and reindeer breeding not found in the other dialects).
Southeastern (shows the most influence from the Mongolian language).
Taiga
Dukha or Tsaatan - spoken by the Dukha people of Tsagaan-Nuur county of Khövsgöl Province (nearly extinct)
Soyot-Tsaatan language spoken in the Okinsky District in Buryatia; now they speak the Buryat language) (Samoyedic Uralic substrate; people shifted first to a Turkic language and after to a Mongolian one - Buryat) (extinct)
Orkhon Turkic / Old Turkic / Old Uyghur (extinct) (not a direct ancestor of Uyghur, that descends from Karluk) (not synonymous with Proto-Turkic)
Yenisei Turkic
Khakas (Xakas tili)
Sagay/Saghay
Kacha/Qaça
Koybal  (Samoyedic Uralic substrate; people shifted to a Turkic language)
Beltir
Kyzyl/Qizil
Fuyu Kyrgyz (could be a dialect of Khakas)
Shor
Mrassu (basis for literary and standard Shor)
Upper Mrassu
Kondoma
Upper-Kondoma
Western Yugur or "Yellow Uighur" (direct descendant of Old Uyghur)
North Siberian
Yakut language
Central
Western Lena
Eastern Lena
Aldan
Peripheral
Northwestern
Northeastern
Dolgan (Dulğan) (Samoyed Uralic and Evenki Tungusic substrates)
Eastern – Khatanga
Central – Avam
Western – Yenisei, Norilsk

Karluk (Southeastern)

Historically in Central Asia there was a distinction between sedentary, called Sart or Taranchi, and nomadic peoples (regardless of the ethnic group and language). Many times it was used confusingly because it was a generic word for several peoples and their languages (mainly Iranians or Turkics) and also because it had different meanings at different historical times (had shifting meanings over the centuries). Strictly it was not an ethnic or linguistic definition but one of a lifestyle. (strong Iranian substrate)
Chagatai or Turki (Jağatāy) (literary language of medieval Golden Horde in much of Central Asia) (extinct)
Pre-classical Chagatai (1400–1465)
Classical Chagatai (1465–1600)
Post-classical Chagatai (1600–1921)
Turkic Khorezmian  (it was a literary language of the medieval Golden Horde of Central Asia and parts of Eastern Europe) (extinct)
East
Uyghur (not a direct descendant of the language called Old Uyghur, Old Turkic or Orkhon Turkic)
Eastern: Spoken in an area stretching from Qarkilik towards north to Qongköl
Central: Spoken in an area stretching from Kumul towards south to Yarkand
Southern: Spoken in an area stretching from Guma towards east to Qarkilik
Lop (Ľor télé) (could be a distinct language)
Ili Turki (Kipchak substrate) (extinct)
West
Uzbek (Karluk Uzbek, Sart Uzbek – Sedentary and Urban Uzbek, “Modern Uzbek”) (strong Iranian substrate from Sogdian and Persian languages)
Northern Uzbek (Oʻzbekcha / Oʻzbek tili)
Ferghana Uzbek (not the same as Kipchak Uzbek)
Tashkent Uzbek
Chimkent/Shymkent-Turkestan Uzbek
Surkhandarya Uzbek
Khorezm Uzbek
Southern Uzbek / Afghan Uzbek (strong Iranian substrate from Bactrian language and heavily Persianized) (many are bilingual in Dari / Dari Persian / East Persian / Afghan Persian)

Kipchak (Northwestern)

Kipchak (extinct)
South Kipchak (Aralo-Caspian Turkic)
Kipchak-Nogai
Fergana Kipchak (Kipchak Uzbek / ”Old Uzbek”) (nomadic and semi-nomadic Turkic of the regions of Fergana, Samarkand, Bukhara and Turkistan) (extinct)
Kazakh (Qazaqsha / Qazaq tili)
Eastern Kazakh
Southern Kazakh
Northern Kazakh
Western Kazakh
Karakalpak (Qaraqalpaq tili) (closer to Kazakh) (Iranian Kwarazmian and Turkic Kwarazmian substrates)
Northeastern Karakalpak
Southwestern Karakalpak
Fergana Valley Karakalpak?
Nogai
Karanogay-Nogai Proper
Karanogay or Qara-Nogai (literally "Black Nogai"; "Northern Nogai"), spoken in Dagestan
Central Nogai or Nogai Proper, in Stavropol
Aqnogai (White or Western Nogai), by the Kuban River, its tributaries in Karachay–Cherkessia, and in the Mineralnye Vody District. Qara-Nogai and Nogai Proper are very close linguistically, whereas Aqnogai is more different.
Kyrgyz-Kypchak
Kyrgyz (Kyrgyzcha / Kyrgyz tili)
Northern Kyrgyz (basis of standard Kyrgyz)
Southern Kyrgyz
Southern Altai
Altai proper
Mayma
Telengit
Tölös
Chuy
Teleut
Siberian Tatar (Sıbır tel)
East Siberian Tatar
Tom
Baraba
West Siberian Tatar
Tobol-Irtysh
North Kipchak (Uralo-Caspian/Volga-Ural Turkic) (has some Uralic substrate)
Old Tatar / Old Bashkir (Volga Turki) (extinct)
Bashkir (Bashqortsa / Bashqort tele)
Southern
Dim
Egän (Zigan)
Eyek-Haqmar
Middle
Örşäk (Urshak)
Eastern
Arğayaş 
Qyźyl 
Meyäs 
Halyot (Salyoğot) 
Northwestern
Tanyp
Ğäynä (dialect of Perm Bashkirs)
Qariźel
Lower Ağiźel
Middle Ural
Tatar (Tatarça / Tatar Tele)
Central/Middle (Kazan) (basis of the standard literary Tatar)
Western (Mişär or Mishar)
West Kipchak (Kipchak-Cuman/Ponto-Caspian Turkic)
Cuman (Polovtsian/Folban/Vallany/Kun) (extinct)
Karachay-Balkar - Kumyk
Karachay-Balkar (Qaraçay-Malqar til / Tawlu til)
Karachay-Baksan-Chegem (basis of the standard language)
Balkar (Malqar)
Kumyk (“Caucasian Tatar”) (Qumuq til) (Oghur Turkic substrate – Khazar and Bulgar)
Terek
Khasavyurt
Buynaksk
Khaitag
Podgorniy
Crimean Tatar (Qırımtatar tili / Qırım tili) (Scytho-Sarmatian and Crimean Gothic substrates)
Northern (Steppe Crimean Tatar/Nogay Steppe) (should not be confused with Nogai people of the Northern Caucasus and the Lower Volga)
Middle (more Cuman type characteristics) (basis of the standard Crimean Tatar)
Southern/Coastal Crimean Tatar (Oghuz Turkic influence)
Krymchak (Judeo-Crimean Tatar) (Qrımçah tılyı) (a different language from Karaim, not confuse with Karaim)
Urum (closely related to Crimean Tatar and spoken by Turkish-speaking Greeks of Southeastern Ukraine and Georgia, etymological related to the Turkish name for Rome - Rûm / Urum, associated with the name of the East Roman Empire, mainly Greek in language) (Greek substrate)
North Azovian (in Ukraine)
Tsalka (in Georgia)
Karaim (Judeo-Crimean) (Qaray tili / Karaj tili) (a different language from Krymchak, not confuse with Krymchak)
Crimean (in Crimea)
Trakai-Vilnius (in Lithuania)
Lutsk-Halych (in Ukraine)

Oghuz (Southwestern Turkic)

East Oghuz (Eastern)
Salar, an Oghuz language outlier strongly influenced by Karluk and Kipchak languages and also by non-Turkic languages like Tibetan and Chinese
Qinghai (Amdo) Salar
Ili Salar
Turkmen 
Teke (Tekke) (basis of the standard Turkmen)
Nohurly
Ýomud 
Änewli 
Hasarly
Nerezim 
Gökleň
Salyr
Saryk 
Ärsary 
Çowdur 
Trukhmen
Transitional East-West Oghuz
Khorasani Turkic
North 
South/Razavi
West
West Oghuz (Western)
Azerbaijani (Azeri Turkic,  has an Iranian substrate from the Old Azeri language, an Indo-European language 
South Azerbaijani
Qarapapaq
Shahsavani (Shahseven)
Muqaddam
Baharlu (Kamesh) 
Nafar
Qaragözlü 
Pishaqchi 
Bayatlu
Qajar
Tabrizi (basis of Standard South Azerbaijani but not identical)
Iraqi Turkmen (South Turkmen)
North Azerbaijani
Salyan
Lenkaran 
Qazakh
Airym
Borcala 
Terekeme 
Qyzylbash 
Nukha
Zaqatala (Mugaly) 
Qabala
Yerevan  
Ordubad
Ganja
Shusha (Karabakh) 
Karapapak
Shirvan dialect
Baku dialect (basis of Standard North Azerbaijani, but not identical)
Shamakhi 
Quba
Derbend
Nakhchivan 
Transitional Turkish Azerbaijani-Turkish
Eastern Anatolian Turkish
Meskhetian Turkish
Hemshen Turkish
Eastern Anatolian Turkish Proper (Kars, Erzurum, other regions)
Zaza Turkish (Turkish spoken by Zazas, not to be confused with Zaza, which is an Iranian language, Zaza substrate)
Kurdish Turkish (Turkish spoken by Kurds, not to be confused with Kurdish which is an Iranian language, Kurdish substrate)
Northeastern Anatolian Turkish (Kuzeydoğu Anadolu Ağızları)
Laz Turkish (Turkish spoken by Laz, do not confuse with Laz which is a Kartvelian language)
Trebizond (Trabzon) Turkish
Old Anatolian Turkish (extinct)
Turkish
Anatolian dialects (Anadolu Ağızları)
Western Anatolian (Batı Anadolu Ağızları)
Central (Orta Anadolu)
East central
West Central
Mediterranean (Akdeniz)/South (Güney)
Southwest (Güneybatı)              
Southeast (Güneydoğu)
Black Sea (Karadeniz)/North (Kuzey)
Çorum, Çankırı
East Black Sea Coast
West Black Sea Coast
Sakarya-Izmit
Aegean (Ege)/West (Batı)        
Yörük (Nomadic Anatolian Turkish)
Istanbul dialect (İstanbul Türkçesi) (basis of Modern Standard Turkish but not identical)
Syrian Turkmen (Syrian Turkish)
Cypriot Turkish
Balkanic/Rumelian/Danubian
East Balkanic/East Rumelian/East Danubian
Edirne
West Balkanic/West Rumelian/West Danubian
Karamanli Turkish (Turkish of the Karamanlides, Turkish-speaking Greeks, Greek language substrate, not confuse with Cappadocian Greek, a mixed language, or the Cappadocian Greeks, although they are related) (almost extinct)
Balkan Gagauz Turkish (Balkan Turkic) (Rumeli Türkçesi)
Gajal
Gerlovo Turk
Karamanli
Kyzylbash 
Surguch
Tozluk Turk
Yuruk
Macedonian Gagauz
Gagauz
Bulgar Gagauzi 
Maritime Gagauzi
Ottoman Turkish(extinct) (not a direct ancestor of Anatolian Turkish but a heavily Persianized and Arabized Turkic language)
Fasih Türkçe (Eloquent Turkish): the language of poetry and administration, Ottoman Turkish in its strict sense
Orta Türkçe (Middle Turkish): the language of higher classes and trade
Kaba Türkçe (Rough Turkish): the language of lower classes.
South Oghuz
Afshar (could be a dialect of South Azerbaijani language)
Aynallu (could be a dialect of South Azerbaijani language)
Qashqai (closely related to Azerbaijani)
Sonqori (could be a dialect of South Azerbaijani)
Pecheneg
Pecheneg (Peçenek) (extinct)

Arghu
Khalaj (a divergent member of the Common Turkic languages, not an Oghuz language) (heavily Persianized) (many are bilingual in Persian / Iranian Persian / Western Persian)
Northern
Southern

Oghur (Lir Turkic / R Turkic)
Proto-Oghur
Bulgar/Bolgar (extinct) (had a Uralic substrate)
Volga Bulgar (extinct)
Chuvash (Căvašla / Çovaşla)
Anatri, or Lower
Viryal, or Upper
Danube Bulgar (extinct in the 10th c. AD assimilated by the Slavic language of the Seven Slavic Tribes, that was close to Old Church Slavonic, but they chose the name Bulgarian as an ethnonym and also for their language because of the origins of much of their ruling class or political elite that was Turkic)
Khazar (extinct) (the language of the Khazars)

Possible Turkic languages (all extinct)
Unclassified languages that may have been Turkic or members of other language families 
Hunnic / Xiongnu (?)
Hunnic / Hunnish - the language or languages of the Huns (there are several hypotheses about their language)
Xiongnu - the language or languages of the Xiongnu (may be the same as the Hunnic language, a closely related one, or not related at all) (there are several hypotheses about their language)
Keraite - the language or languages of the Keraites (in today's Central Mongolia) (Mongolized after Temüjin, called Chinggis Khan, conquest in the 13th century) (Qarai Turks, the Kerey Kazakh group of the middle zhuz Argyns, the Kireis, a group of the Kyrgyz and many Torghut may descend from them) (there are several hypotheses about their language)
Old Naiman - the language or languages of the old Naimans (in today's Western and Southwestern Mongolia) (Mongolized after Temüjin, called Chinggis Khan, conquest in the 13th century) (Naiman, however, is the Mongol name for the numeral eight) (there are several hypotheses about their language)
Pannonian Avar - the language or languages of the Pannonian Avars (there are several hypotheses about their language)

Possible Mixed Turkic-Iranian language
Äynu / Aini (Äynú) (could be a mixed language) (Turkic cryptolect with a mainly Iranian vocabulary and Turkic grammar, spoken by the Äynu people, a different people from the Uyghur)

Constructed languages
 Jalpi Türk language (crh) is a constructed language created by Ismail Gasprinsky in the 19th century.
 Ortatürk (tt) is a constructed language created by Baxtiyar Kärimov between 1993-2008.

See also
 Turkic languages

References

 Akhatov G. Kh. 1960. "About the stress in the language of the Siberian Tatars in connection with the stress of modern Tatar literary language" .- Sat *"Problems of Turkic and the history of Russian Oriental Studies." Kazan. 
 Akhatov G.Kh. 1963. "Dialect West Siberian Tatars" (monograph). Ufa. 
 Baskakov, N.A. 1962, 1969. Introduction to the study of the Turkic languages. Moscow. 
 Boeschoten, Hendrik & Lars Johanson. 2006. Turkic languages in contact. Turcologica, Bd. 61. Wiesbaden: Harrassowitz. 
 Clausen, Gerard. 1972. An etymological dictionary of pre-thirteenth-century Turkish. Oxford: Oxford University Press.
 Deny,  Jean et al. 1959–1964. Philologiae Turcicae Fundamenta. Wiesbaden: Harrassowitz.
 Dolatkhah, Sohrab. 2016. Parlons qashqay. In: collection "parlons". Paris: L'Harmattan.
 Dolatkhah, Sohrab. 2016. Le qashqay: langue turcique d'Iran. CreateSpace Independent Publishing Platform (online).
 Dolatkhah, Sohrab. 2015. Qashqay Folktales. CreateSpace Independent Publishing Platform (online).
 Johanson, Lars & Éva Agnes Csató (ed.). 1998. The Turkic languages. London: Routledge. .
 Johanson, Lars. 1998. "The history of Turkic." In: Johanson & Csató, pp. 81–125.
 Johanson, Lars. 1998. "Turkic languages." In: Encyclopædia Britannica. CD 98. Encyclopædia Britannica Online, 5 sept. 2007.
 Menges, K. H. 1968. The Turkic languages and peoples: An introduction to Turkic studies. Wiesbaden: Harrassowitz.
 Öztopçu, Kurtuluş. 1996. Dictionary of the Turkic languages: English, Azerbaijani, Kazakh, Kyrgyz, Tatar, Turkish, Turkmen, Uighur, Uzbek. London: Routledge. 
 Samoilovich, A. N. 1922. Some additions to the classification of the Turkish languages. Petrograd.
 Schönig, Claus. 1997–1998. "A new attempt to classify the Turkic languages I-III." Turkic Languages 1:1.117–133, 1:2.262–277, 2:1.130–151.
 Starostin, Sergei A., Anna V. Dybo, and Oleg A. Mudrak. 2003. Etymological Dictionary of the Altaic Languages. Leiden: Brill. 
 Voegelin, C.F. & F.M. Voegelin. 1977. Classification and index of the World's languages. New York: Elsevier.

External links
 Interactive map of Turkic Languages
 Endangered Turkic languages 
 Chart of Turkic languages 
 Turkic Languages Verb Comparison
 Turkic Inscriptions of Orkhon Valley, Mongolia
 Turkic Languages: Resources – University of Michigan
 Map of Turkic languages
 Classification of Turkic Languages
 Online Uyghur–English Dictionary
 
 Turkic language vocabulary comparison tool / dictionary
 A Comparative Dictionary of Turkic Languages Open Project
 The Turkic Languages in a Nutshell with illustrations.
 Swadesh lists of Turkic basic vocabulary words (from Wiktionary's Swadesh-list appendix)
 Conferences on Turkic languages processing: Astana, Kazakhstan, 2013, Istanbul, Turkey, 2014, Kazan, Tatarstan, 2015

Turkic languages
Turkic